Dori Lal Agarawal Sports Stadium or Regional Sports Stadium is a multi-purpose stadium in Bareilly, Uttar Pradesh. The ground is mainly used for organizing matches of football, cricket, Netball, Handball, Basketball and other sports. The stadium was established in 1960 and has hosted international matches between India women's cricket team and Sri Lanka women's cricket team.

In 2015, the Government of Uttar Pradesh decided to upgrade the stadium's core via construction of a dormitory with 400 beds for both male and female players, as well as staircases.

In August 2015, the stadium hosted the Indian Gramin Cricket League, a local Twenty20 tournament for rural areas.

References

External links 

 cricketarchive
 cricinfo
 Official Website of Bareilly 
 Bareilly Development Authority

Sports venues in Uttar Pradesh
Cricket grounds in Uttar Pradesh
Buildings and structures in Bareilly
Sports venues completed in 1960
1960 establishments in Uttar Pradesh
20th-century architecture in India